Rochelle Nicole Loewen (born October 26, 1979) is a Canadian broadcaster, former Glamour model and WWE Diva.

Modeling career 
Rochelle began modeling in her late teens and competed in Canada's Hawaiian Tropic contests, winning the title of Miss Hawaiian Tropic Canada 1999-2000. She also became the face of many magazines such as Muscle & Fitness and Muscle & Fitness Hers. Rochelle was offered and accepted a contract with World Wrestling Entertainment.

World Wrestling Entertainment 
In 2003, Loewen appeared on World Wrestling Entertainment's Raw brand, escorting Lance Storm and Val Venis to the ring on the December 8th episode. After getting signed by WWE the following year, Loewen made her second appearance on Raw, as a model who tried to get a job as a diva through Raw General Manager Eric Bischoff. Loewen was then moved to the SmackDown! brand. Her first appearance was with the recently hired Lauren Jones as they complimented John Cena on his new belt. On the next SmackDown! taping Cena entered into a Rap contest against Kenzo Suzuki, and he invited Loewen and other SmackDown! divas Michelle McCool and Lauren Jones to join him at ringside.

Loewen would then be featured sporadically in backstage events. In one incident Loewen, Dawn Marie, Michelle McCool and Jones distracted fellow wrestler Amy Weber while Joy Giovanni sneaked up behind her and proceeded to pour her milkshake all over Weber much to the amusement of the other wrestlers. At No Way Out Loewen competed against fellow SmackDown! wrestlers Jones, Giovanni, and McCool for the title of SmackDown! Rookie Diva of the Year. This would be one of Loewen's last appearances with WWE as she left the company a few weeks later.

Post-WWE 
Loewen competed on the Lingerie Football team LA Temptation for 2004, 2005, 2006, and the 2007 Lingerie Bowl.
In 2006 Rochelle completed the Radio, Television and Broadcast News program at SAIT in Calgary in 2011.  
Rochelle competed on the second season of Gillette Drafted, She was cut from the competition during week 3 during the elimination ceremony after the judges questioned her sports-related knowledge.
As of 2008, she is self-employed as a personal trainer at Loewen Fitness.

References

External links 

Rochelle Loewen on Myspace

1979 births
Canadian people of German descent
Living people
Miss Hawaiian Tropic delegates
Professional wrestling managers and valets
Professional wrestlers from Alberta
Sportspeople from Edmonton